Steven Michael Hawkins (born October 28, 1972), is an American former professional basketball player. During his professional club career, Hawkins played in the National Basketball Association (NBA), and in several other leagues around the world.

College career
Hawkins, a 6'0" (1.83 m) tall point guard, along with his classmate and future NBA player Eric Snow, played high school basketball at Canton McKinley High School, where Hawkins graduated from in 1991. After high school, Hawkins played college basketball at Xavier University, where he played with the 
Xavier Musketeers, from 1991 to 1995.

Professional career
After not being selected in the 1995 NBA Draft out of  when he signed with the Boston Celtics in 1997. Over the next four years he played for three other NBA teams, finally finishing his short NBA career with his hometown Cleveland Cavaliers in 2001.

Hawkins ended his pro club career with Al-Jalaa Aleppo, of the Syrian Basketball League.

National team career
Hawkins played with the USA national team at the 1998 FIBA World Championship. With Team USA, he won a bronze medal at that tournament. He also played with Team USA at the 1999 Pan American Games, where he won a silver medal.

Coaching career
After he retired from playing pro club basketball, Hawkins began working as a coach. He coaches in the Houston area, with the private coaching service, CoachUp.

References

External links

Player Profile @ archive.fiba.com
Player Profile @ ACB.com 
Player Profile @ Eurobasket.com
Player Profile @ EuroLeague.net
Player Profile @ FIBAEurope.com
Player Profile @ ProBallers.com

1972 births
Living people
20th-century African-American sportspeople
21st-century African-American sportspeople
1998 FIBA World Championship players
African-American basketball players
American expatriate basketball people in Belgium
American expatriate basketball people in Greece
American expatriate basketball people in Poland
American expatriate basketball people in Spain
American expatriate basketball people in Syria
American men's basketball players
Basketball players at the 1999 Pan American Games
Basketball players from Canton, Ohio
BC Oostende players
Boston Celtics players
Charlotte Hornets players
Cleveland Cavaliers players
FC Barcelona Bàsquet players
Liga ACB players
Medalists at the 1999 Pan American Games
Olympiacos B.C. players
Pan American Games medalists in basketball
Pan American Games silver medalists for the United States
Point guards
Real Madrid Baloncesto players
Rockford Lightning players
Sacramento Kings players
Sioux Falls Skyforce (CBA) players
Śląsk Wrocław basketball players
UB La Palma players
Undrafted National Basketball Association players
United States men's national basketball team players
Xavier Musketeers men's basketball players